Abdulla Sodiq (Arabic: عبد الله  صادق, ; born June 9, 1969) is the first mayor of Addu City, Maldives. He was elected mayor in February 2011 for a three-year term as mandated by the newly instated Decentralization Act. He was reelected on February 1, 2014.

Early life 
The eldest of seven siblings, Abdulla Sodiq grew up in Randooga’ndu, Hithadhoo, a part of Addu Atoll. Sodiq studied at Nooraanee School and continued his secondary school education at  Malé English School. He went on to complete his higher education at the University of South Australia (Applied Chemistry & Chemical Technology, BSc.).

Political activism and imprisonment 
After returning to the Maldives, Sodiq began teaching at the Southern Secondary School, the first secondary school in Hithadhoo. During this time, Sodiq and his colleagues started important community projects in Addu Atoll such as a preparatory school for students with learning difficulties.

Sodiq is also a founding member of the NGO Maavahi. The organization was formed to encourage debate and activism on sustainable socio-economic development in a harmonized and protected ecosystem.

An outspoken critic of former-president Maumoon Abdul Gayyoom, Sodiq was one of the pioneers of the opposition political movement in Addu following the political uprising of 2004. He was imprisoned during the incarceration of political activists at the time, and was released after 74 days in prison.

Sodiq started his political career as the vice-president of the Maldivian Democratic Party’s (MDP) chapter in Seenu Hithadhoo.

Atoll councillor 
Sodiq was soon appointed an atoll councillor of Addu City, Maldives following the presidential election of 2008. Since then, Sodiq has worked to create development opportunities for Addu Atoll. One of his most noteworthy accomplishments during his term in office was to lobby for legislation to grant city status to Addu City, Maldives and create the legal framework for the management of municipal funds and development planning by a city council for Addu Atoll. The improved efficiency of operating local municipalities (atolls and islands) through this reformed process removed political and administrative obstacles.

Mayoralty 
Abdulla Sodiq assumed office as the first mayor of Addu City on February 24, 2011. President Mohamed Nasheed's decision to hold the South Asian Association for Regional Cooperation summit in Addu City facilitated investments in public infrastructure including the construction of Hithadhoo district's main road (divehi: ބޮޑުމަގު), which spanned up to 4.5 km and the renovation of street-lights in Addu City. The government also completed the construction of the Equatorial Convention Center (ECC) in Addu City exclusively to host the 17th SAARC summit in the Maldives. The Government's effort in instating Addu City was part of its plan to showcase a model for development in the SAARC region and place Addu City on the world map.
Among other projects that have been initiated during Sadiq's term in office are the Hulhumeedhoo Harbor and Sewerage Project, Feydhoo Harbor Project, and the Feydhoo and Maradhoo Road Construction Project with the assistance of the Government of Sri Lanka.

References

External links 
 Addu City

1969 births
Living people
Maldivian Democratic Party politicians
University of South Australia alumni
Maldivian Muslims
People from Addu City